Touchstone Game Reserve is a  privately owned 100,000 Hectare game farm that is situated in the north-western section of the Waterberg Biosphere Reserve in the Limpopo province of South Africa.

Wildlife 
The wildlife hosted by the reserve include the "big five game":
Lion
Leopard
Elephant
Rhinoceros
Buffalo

See also 
 Protected areas of South Africa

References

Nature reserves in South Africa